Hinduism in the Seychelles is the second largest religion after Christianity, with more than 2.4% of the population. The Hindu following in Seychelles has seen an increase in the community with the organization of the Seychelles Hindu Kovil Sangam and the consecration of the Navasakti Vinayagar Temple. The increase in size and popularity of Hinduism caused the Government to declare Taippoosam Kavadi Festival a holiday.

6% of the population of Seychelles are Ethnic Indians. But only 2.4% are Hindus

History of Hindus in Seychelles
In 1901, there were 332 Hindu families out of a population of 19,237 and roughly 3,500 Tamil-speaking people.

The organization of the Seychelles Hindu Kovil Sangam in 1984 and the consecration of the Navasakti Vinayagar Temple in May 1992 were landmarks for the resurgence of Indian cultural activities apart from the religious awakening.

Demographics 

According to the 2010 Census, there were 2,174 Hindus in the Seychelles constituting 2.4 % of the population of Seychelles. This is an increase of 470 from the 2002 census, which reported 1,700 Hindus constituting 2.1 % of the population. In 1994, there were 953 Hindus constituting 1.3 % of the country's population.

Seychelles Hindu Kovil Sangam
The Seychelles Hindu Kovil Sangam, over a short span of seventeen years, has successfully established and entrenched some strong foundations for the preservation, consolidation and further flowering of the Hindu culture. The ever-popular kavadi festival and special Hindu festivals are covered in Tamil and English in the national media and there is a wide coverage of such events over national radio and television.

Arulmigu Navasakti Vinayagar Temple

The Arulmigu Navasakti Vinayagar Temple is the first and the only Hindu temple in Seychelles that has Ganesha as the presiding deity. Since 1999, Ganesha has been elevated to this position. Apart from the presiding deity, icons of Murugan, Nadarajah, Durga, Sreenivasa Perumal, Bhairawa and Chandekeswarar are enshrined in the inner mandapam of the temple. Prayers are performed for the different deities on special occasions.

Taippoosam Kavadi Festival, which began in Seychelles in the inner courtyard of the temple during 1993, is now conducted in the outer courtyard and a chariot kavadi is also taken out in procession. This festival has gained popularity as a national festival, so much so that as from 1998 the government has declared it a holiday for Hindus.

Famous Seychelles Hindus
Satya Naidu- first Hindu member of Seychelles National Assembly.

See also
Hinduism in Africa

References

External links
Indian Community in Seychelles
Tamil Hindus in Seychelles